Ratmate is a ward under Belkotgadhi Municipality but was village development committee in Nuwakot District in the  Bagmati Province of central Nepal. At the time of the 1991 Nepal census it had a population of 2997 people living in 567 individual households.  Bhubaneshwor Nepal is the president of this ward after local election held in 2079 BS where Mr. Nepal secured total of 835 votes.  There are Villages like of Mahadevphant , ratmate and Chandretar. Mahadev Secondary School is the main educational hub. There are few brick company factory and there are huge sand/aggregate excavation from Trishuli river.

References
http://belkotgadhimun.gov.np/

External links
UN map of the municipalities of Nuwakot District
http://belkotgadhimun.gov.np/

Populated places in Nuwakot District